The 1866 Melbourne Cup was a two-mile handicap horse race which took place on Thursday, 1 November 1866.

This year was the sixth running of the Melbourne Cup. The race was won by 6/1 favourite The Barb, nicknamed 'The Black Demon', beating Exile. Falcon was placed third by the stewards the day after the race. The race saw two horses named Falcon take part and the VRC judge failed to recognise its colors which were different to the official program. The Barb became the first horse to win the Melbourne Cup and the AJC Derby as The Barb had won the race back in September. The AJC Derby now takes place in the Autumn.

This is the list of placegetters for the 1866 Melbourne Cup.

See also

 Melbourne Cup
 List of Melbourne Cup winners
 Victoria Racing Club

References

External links
1866 Melbourne Cup footyjumpers.com

1866
Melbourne Cup
Melbourne Cup
19th century in Melbourne
1860s in Melbourne